Descendants of the Qajar dynasty through Prince Hessam-ol-Saltaneh, son of the Persian Crown Prince Abbas Mirza.

See also
 Persia
 History of Persia
 History of Iran
 Qajar dynasty of Iran

External links
  Genealogy and History of Qajar (Kadjar) Rulers and Heads of the Imperial Kadjar House

Sources
 The history of Persia, Sir John Malcolm. John Murray Publishers, London, 1960

Iranian nobility